Agonum sulcipenne is a species of ground beetle in the Platyninae subfamily that can be found in the United States.

References

Beetles described in 1881
Taxa named by George Henry Horn
sulcipenne
Endemic fauna of the United States